The 1997 Phoenix 200 was the fourth round of the 1996–1997 Indy Racing League. The race was held on March 23, 1997, at the  Phoenix International Raceway in Avondale, Arizona, and was won by the unheralded Jim Guthrie, who raced unsponsored, owing a big sum of money and having taken a second mortgage on his house. His win, beating IRL stalwart Tony Stewart after leading 74 laps, went down as one of the biggest upsets in the history of Indy car racing.

Report

Pre-Race
Shortly after the race at Walt Disney World Speedway, the significant injuries sustained by both Davy Jones and Eliseo Salazar in rear-first crashes raised some safety concerns. The Indy Racing League addressed them by mandating a seven-pound attenuator fixed behind the gearbox, to act as a 'crash-box' and better dissipate the energy in that area. On February 4–7, the week after the Copper World Classic, Goodyear kickstarted testing at Phoenix with 5 drivers. After running newcomer Jeff Ward at Orlando, Galles Racing sought a replacement for the injured Jones, and tried 1996 Formula 3000 runner-up Kenny Bräck, who had only run an oval in 1993 at New Hampshire during his Barber Saab Pro Series title run. After posting the fastest time of the week at 165.975 mph, the 30-year old Swede was signed for the rest of the season a few days later.

On February 18, Texas Motor Speedway held its first ever IRL test with Tony Stewart and Buddy Lazier, although the three-day program devised by Firestone was cut in half because of windy conditions and the threat of rain. From February 24–28, 24 drivers took part in the 'Test in the West' at Phoenix, with the only absences of Beck Motorsports, still without engines, and Chitwood Motorsports. Two drivers stood out over the rest, as Scott Sharp and Tony Stewart shared the lead over the five days, being the only drivers to go over the 170 mph mark. A. J. Foyt Enterprises had bought a G-Force chassis to evaluate it against the Dallara, and Sharp had the edge on it with a 170.777 mph lap. His teammate Davey Hamilton, finished 3.5 mph behind, although third overall, just in front of a surprising Jim Guthrie, while early favourite Arie Luyendyk and championship leader Mike Groff lagged behind.

Infiniti also had problems with its few drivers and engines, as Buddy Lazier, Groff and Jack Miller had engine issues throughout the week because of a faulty bearing application. Sam Schmidt, who had finished fourth in the U.S. F2000 in 1996, got to pass his rookie test in order to race the second Blueprint Racing car. Schmidt had planned to debut at Orlando, but it had been pushed to Phoenix due to the lack of testing and engine shortages. Team Menard, on the other hand, tested Billy Boat and Dave Blaney as contenders for their second seat, with Mark Dismore being out of the team. Both finished in the overall top 10, Boat being slightly faster, but neither would get the drive in the end. Also, the PDM Racing mule car was brought again for Darrin Miller and Pat Abold, both passing their rookie tests.

The entry list was unveiled on March 5 with 23 entries, including Danny Ongais, Robbie Buhl and the second Menard car, still unassigned. EuroInternational, with the legendary chief mechanic George Bignotti, also filled an entry for Phoenix resident Billy Roe, who attempted to race the previous year. One day later, Team Menard confirmed Robbie Buhl as their second driver, leaving Beck Motorsports without a driver. Further testing was conducted on the Indianapolis Motor Speedway the following week: Fermín Vélez drove for Goodyear, while Tony Stewart, who topped out at 216.080 mph, and John Paul Jr. did it for Firestone. In between those tests, Stan Wattles confirmed that Metro Racing Systems would become the second team to take on the Riley & Scott chassis, with a delivery date expected for July, and, on March 19, Team SABCO had a 300-mile test at Indianapolis with Robby Gordon, who was due to attempt the Double Duty in May.

Practice and qualifying
On race week, Chitwood Motorsports replaced Danny Ongais with Affonso Giaffone, supported by General Motors do Brasil, originally in a one-race deal. As in Orlando, Tony Stewart swept both practice sessions during the first day with a 165.983 mph lap in the morning, and a 164.865 mph lap in the afternoon. Jim Guthrie doubled down on his testing results and emerged as Stewart's main contender, being second in the morning and third in the afternoon behind Arie Luyendyk. Spaniard Fermín Vélez also surprised in the morning by posting the third fastest time, just before blowing an engine. Marco Greco and Scott Sharp had engine problems in the morning too, while Roberto Guerrero and Giaffone crashed in the afternoon. Guerrero's crashed was triggered by another engine failure, which brought concerns on the Oldsmobile camp regarding a potential oil link issue in their engines. Despite also entering a couple of Dallaras, Foyt decided to run the G-Force chassis for both of his drivers.

On Saturday, Stewart led the last practice session over Guthrie (0.021s off) and Luyendyk with a 167.973 mph lap, and asserted his dominance on qualifying, putting his car on pole with a 170.012 mph lap. Guthrie was the last driver scheduled to qualify and, despite running the fastest first lap, he came up short at 169.484 mph, comfortably qualifying in a career-best second place. Despite the IRL cars being 15 mph off 1996's speeds, Guthrie qualified 6 mph faster than the previous year, when he qualified 18th. He likened his efforts as "the David and Goliath story", as he was competing unsponsored, with an engine that had run 640 miles and had been rebuilt three times, as they could not afford a new one. Guthrie owed $185,000 to his creditors, having bought his chassis by taking out a loan against his house for a second time. His team, of which Guthrie was co-owner, arrived at the track with a rental flatbed trailer and a race crew composed of volunteers. 4 mph off Stewart, Treadway Racing swept the second row with Scott Goodyear and Luyendyk, in front of Buzz Calkins and Robbie Buhl, the early leaders before Stewart's run.

In his first IRL qualifying, Sam Schmidt put his car in a solid seventh place, while Kenny Bräck and Billy Roe managed 10th and 18th, respectively. Roberto Guerrero was the fastest Infiniti qualifier in 11th place after getting his car fixed in time, unlike Affonso Giaffone, who was not able to qualify. In a similar note, Scott Sharp had put his car in second place during the morning practice when his engine caught fire, with a spare not being ready in time for qualifying. Both were be allowed to start the race at the back of the field. Coincidentally, Marco Greco was able to qualify thanks to an engine previously loaned by A. J. Foyt Enterprises, achieving his first top-10 qualifying result. Sharp's teammate, Davey Hamilton, could only qualify in 15th place, not coming to grips with his new chassis, just behind Buddy Lazier, while championship leader Mike Groff was mired in 17th place. John Paul Jr. qualified 12th despite waving off his first lap for a suspected timing chain failure, and Stéphan Grégoire qualified last after losing a gear. During afternoon's final practice, Buzz Calkins had an oil leak and crashed in Turn 4, which forced his team to opt for a back-up car, forfeiting his 5th place on the grid. For the first time in series' history, all the drivers that took part in the practice sessions would start the race.

  His engine caught fire in practice, and a spare was not ready on time for qualifying. He was allowed to start the race at the back of the field.
  Couldn't qualify after his chassis had been damaged in a practice crash. He was allowed to start the race at the back of the field.
  Changed to a backup car following a crash in a practice session after qualifying.

Race
The Phoenix event resulted in a slow, attrition-filled race, as 83 of the 200 laps were run under nine caution periods. It became the second slowest Indy car race ever held at Phoenix, with an average speed of just 89.19 mph, just under 3 mph faster than the 1967 Jimmy Bryan Memorial, and slower than any NASCAR Cup Series race ever held at the track since their debut in 1988. At 2 hours and 14 minutes, it ran 45 minutes longer than the 1986 Circle K/Fiesta Bowl 200, which had the average speed record at 134.676 mph, and it is also the longest of all Indy car races at Phoenix. Six of the nine caution periods were caused by engine failures and oil spills, five from the Oldsmobile engines, which suffered a dozen failures overall throughout the weekend. It wasn't until after the event that the brand identified the issue as an oil line fitting that wasn't suitable in the plumbing system of the new IRL chassis. Despite that, the race was won by Jim Guthrie, who ended the day with 860 miles of running in its engine.

From his front-row position, Guthrie tried to jump Tony Stewart going side by side on the outside, but the pole-sitter held on into Turn 1, while Scott Goodyear lost a couple places. Starting 10th, Roberto Guerrero suffered a battery failure and was unable to get going. He tried to get up to speed, but he had to pull into the apron on Lap 2, bringing out the caution. He was able to take the restart on Lap 7, albeit five laps down. Guthrie tried again on the restart in a similar manner, this time on the inside, to no avail, having to defend himself from Arie Luyendyk. In that restart, John Paul Jr. climbed up to 4th after gaining four spots, having already passed three cars at the start. On Lap 12, Luyendyk lost an engine that had been mounted just the day before, triggering the second caution of the day. At the restart on Lap 19, Paul Jr. passed Guthrie for second, but he didn't have enough rhythm to go after Stewart, and Guthrie reclaimed the spot three laps later, keeping himself within 3–4 seconds of Stewart.

During this stint, Affonso Giaffone was the biggest mover: from Lap 25 to 35, he moved up eight positions, up to 6th place. After some good laps, being as high as 7th, Buddy Lazier slowly faded and had to retire on Lap 33 while running 9th, due to an engine failure. Extensive oil spilling on the track and pit entry brought up a 10-lap caution. As the leaders headed to the pits to make their first stop, Guthrie had the lapped car of Roberto Guerrero on the inside, and had to swerve up the track, missing the pits. He was serviced a lap later, dropping several places. During his stop, John Paul Jr. suffered an electrical issue that made him lose several laps, leaving Scott Goodyear and Robbie Buhl as Stewart's main contenders. Meanwhile, Giaffone, Eddie Cheever (7th before the caution period), Kenny Bräck (10th) and Scott Sharp (11th) stayed on track, and led the field to the restart on Lap 45. By that point, 12 drivers were on the lead lap.

On the restart, Stewart passed Sharp, and both were able to put Bräck behind on that lap. The three of them quickly caught up to Cheever, and passed him on Lap 51 when he run high on Turn 3 due to a misfire. Guthrie, meanwhile, had passed four cars on track. On Lap 52, Scott Goodyear lost his engine on the exit of Turn 1 while running sixth. Marco Greco spun on the oil and Buhl, who had been passed by the Brazilian on the restart, was slightly hit by Sam Schmidt when he braked trying to avoid the accident. Just behind them, Jeret Schroeder lost control of the car and crashed into the outside wall. He was transported by ambulance with a mild concussion and a shoulder abrasion. Out of all the drivers involved, only Greco, who stayed in 7th place, and Schmidt (a lap down) continued. During the caution, Affonso Giaffone and Kenny Bräck made their pit stops, handing the lead to Stewart, but Giaffone would stop again on Lap 61 after he spun on the grass during the restart. As the green flag waved, Scott Sharp took advantage of Stewart's cold tires and grabbed the lead, only for his engine to blow up four laps later. He was able to pull into the paddock by an access road located after Turn 1, and there was no caution for it, but it came out two laps later when John Paul Jr. slowed on the backstretch.

With only six drivers on the lead lap, Eddie Cheever elected to make his first pit stop, restarting behind Stewart, Guthrie, Greco, Davey Hamilton, highly benefitted by the retirements, and Bräck on Lap 76. The Swede, in his debut Indy car race, soon emerged as a serious contender and quickly put himself in third place (Hamilton also passed Greco), although he lost 10 seconds to Stewart and Guthrie. Another debutant, Billy Roe, started losing oil on Lap 82 while running 11th, but he was not aware of the smoke nor the black flags, and crashed heavily on Lap 85, entering Turn 3. During a long caution, Stewart chose to make a pit stop, while Guthrie's crew was pushing for a Lap 120 stop, providing there was another caution on that period, to try and jump Stewart. After the restart on Lap 99, Guthrie pulled an 11-second lead over Kenny Bräck, while Stewart climbed to third by Lap 112. Five laps later, Giaffone, a lap down in 7th place, pulled to the side of the track with a half-shaft problem, and brought a vital caution for Guthrie's odds, whose strategy was to go flat-out until the end, hoping that a couple more caution periods allowed him to make it without a pit stop. Stewart topped off a lap later than Guthrie, and emerged in front of him, but his team was planning for a late splash-and-go. A lengthy clean-up ensued, on which Eddie Cheever retired with an oil pressure issue, after repeatedly trying to pass Marco Greco.

A first attempt at a restart on Lap 129 was aborted by the officials for an additional track inspection when the front of the field, led by lapped cars, was already on Turn 3. The Pace Car driven by Johnny Rutherford had started to pull into the pit lane, before swerving back onto the left side of the track at the last minute. Unaware of the situation, Mike Groff, John Paul Jr. and Roberto Guerrero all sprinted past Rutherford before being told to slow down. New race leader Kenny Bräck, who was due to make his second pit-stop, also passed the Pace Car briefly on the frontstretch, but the situation was quickly rearranged without any penalties. On Lap 133, the race was restarted, with Hamilton and Stewart passing Greco simultaneously on the outside of Turn 3, but Hamilton would be passed by Stewart in the same fashion two laps later, after being blocked by Groff. By Lap 140, Guthrie also got past Hamilton, and joined Stewart in pursuing Bräck. All three drivers were a second apart of each other when, on Lap 146, Bräck run slightly high into the oil dry in Turn 3, spun by himself and crashed in Turn 3. Stewart pitted for a splash of fuel and some tyre pressure changes just before the Lap 155 restart, and quickly passed Greco (who had also pitted), but he faced a crowded traffic situation afterwards, and his rhythm was not a match for Guthrie, who consistently lapped over 160 mph in a 26-lap green flag run, the longest of the day.

By Lap 178, Stewart was 15 seconds behind Guthrie, and 4 seconds behind Hamilton, while Greco had gone a lap down. 20 laps from the end, Sam Schmidt was trying to hunt down Stéphan Grégoire for fifth place when he lost the right-rear tyre entering Turn 3, right in front of Davey Hamilton. The rear-first crash pounded a significant hole in the concrete wall that had to be heftily fixed with a metal plate, while Schmidt was transported by ambulance with mid-back pain, although uninjured. Having complained of handling issues in the previous laps, and aiming to run down Guthrie after the restart, Stewart pitted twice under the caution, the first one for drastic changes in his rear wing, and the second one for fuel and 'option', grippier tires, briefly stalling the engine afterwards. Guthrie stayed out, looking to stretch his fuel. At the last restart with 9 laps to go, Stewart got going behind the lapped cars of Marco Greco and Roberto Guerrero, which he passed in the following lap. Aiming for the win, Stewart passed Hamilton on the outside of Turn 3 with five laps to go, and was gaining on Guthrie at a half second per lap, but he ran out of time, and Guthrie held on by less than a second.

Just like Arie Luyendyk six years before, Guthrie won with an unsponsored car, and the $170,100 payoff helped in partially settling his debts. This would be Guthrie's one-and-only podium finish of his Indy car career. A month later, the team announced a year-long sponsorship agreement with Jacuzzi, which on paper assured him of a proper effort for the Indianapolis 500 with new engines and a back-up. For the fifth race in a row, the Indy Racing League had produced a first-time Indy car winner, an unprecedented feat in post-war Indy car history. After Stewart, Davey Hamilton got his first podium finish in Indy car racing and jumped to second in the standings, while Marco Greco (fourth top 10 finish in four races) and Stéphan Grégoire had their first top-5 finish ever. Mike Groff, who run a cautious race and was down to 18th place at one point, lost four laps after he was shown a black flag on Lap 138, as his car was smoking while leading a restart as a lapped car, but the high attrition allowed him to end sixth, a lap in front of Roberto Guerrero, and to keep the championship lead. With barely any setup in his back-up car, Buzz Calkins was not a factor during the race, ending 8th just by finishing the race, just like John Paul Jr.

Race Statistics
 Lead changes: 10 among 5 drivers

Standings after the race

Drivers' Championship standings

 Note: Only the top five positions are included for the standings.

References

External links
 IndyCar official website

1996–97 in IndyCar
Phoenix 200